Kirsteen MacDonald is a Scottish broadcaster.

MacDonald was born in Inverness, and educated at the Gaelic-medium unit at the city's Central Primary School, and at Millburn Academy.

She is a weather presenter for BBC Scotland.

Macdonald won the prestigious women's gold medal at the Royal National Mòd in 2006. In 2008, she had an operation to remove her appendix, shortly after her operation she entered the Mòd in Falkirk, where she won the women's traditional medal. MacDonald received the "Gaelic Ambassador of the Year Award" at the 2014 Royal National Mod.

References

People from Inverness
People educated at Millburn Academy
Scottish television presenters
Scottish women television presenters
Weather presenters
Living people
Year of birth missing (living people)